Defining Moments is a 2021 Canadian comedy film written and directed by Stephen Wallis and starring Burt Reynolds (in his final film appearance), Graham Greene and Sienna Guillory.

Cast
Burt Reynolds as Chester
Graham Greene as Dr. Kelly
Sienna Guillory as Lisa
Tammy Blanchard as Laurel
Eric Peterson as Edward
Shawn Roberts as Jack
Polly Shannon as Marina
Dillon Casey as Dave
Nicholas Campbell as Foddy
Andy McQueen as Peter

Production
Filming occurred in Unionville, Ontario and Markham, Ontario and wrapped in September 2017.

Release
The film was released in theaters and on demand on August 27, 2021.

References

External links
 
 

Films shot in Ontario